Hill 'n' Dale Farms is a thoroughbred race horse breeding farm with operations in Canada and the United States.

History
Hill 'n' Dale was founded in 1960 in Ontario, Canada by Czechoslovakian immigrant John Sikura, Jr. Following John's death in an automobile accident in 1994, Hill 'n' Dale's American and Canadian operations were taken over by sons John G. Sikura and R. Glenn Sikura, respectively.

Notable broodmares that have resided at Hill 'n' Dale include Horse of the Year Azeri, 1999 Champion 3-Yr-Old Filly Silverbulletday, 1991 Canadian Triple Crown champion Dance Smartly, and Better Than Honour, the mother of Belmont Stakes winners Jazil and Rags to Riches. In 2007, Azeri gave birth to a chestnut colt by another Horse of the Year, A. P. Indy.

The old Hill 'n' Dale farm in Lexington, Kentucky is the burial place of Triple Crown winner Seattle Slew.

Hill 'n' Dale closed its Lexington operations in October 2020 and the entire roster of horses was moved to Xalapa Farm in Paris, which John G. Sikura purchased in 2019. The operation is now referred to as "Hill 'n' Dale at Xalapa."

References

External links
 Hill 'n' Dale Farms, Aurora, Ontario
 Hill 'n' Dale at Xalapa, Paris, Kentucky

American racehorse owners and breeders
Canadian racehorse owners and breeders
Horse farms in Canada
Horse farms in Kentucky
Horse monuments
Aurora, Ontario
Companies based in Lexington, Kentucky
1960 establishments in Ontario
Bourbon County, Kentucky